Silvaco Data Systems v. Intel Corp was a trade secrets case heard before the California Court of Appeal for the Sixth District. Silvaco sued Intel for misappropriation of trade secrets because Intel used software produced by a third-party that had misappropriated Silvaco's trade secrets. The appeals court affirmed the decision of the trial court to grant summary judgment in favor of Intel, finding that merely using infringing software does not constitute a trade secret infringement in itself.

Background
Silvaco is a California-based company that produces electronic design automation (EDA) software. Silvaco makes several EDA products including SmartSpice, a tool for designing and simulating analog circuits. In December 2000, Silvaco sued Circuit Semantics, Inc. (CSI) for misappropriating Silvaco's trade secrets in the design of DynaSpice, a CSI product that competed with SmartSpice. This case went to trial, where Silvaco eventually prevailed.

Silvaco then sued several customers of CSI that had used DynaSpice, including Intel. Silvaco argued that by using DynaSpice, Intel was guilty of misappropriation of trade secrets under the California Uniform Trade Secrets Act (CUTSA). Intel demurred; that is, they argued that, even if they had used DynaSpice, their use of DynaSpice did not constitute misappropriation of trade secrets. In particular, Intel presented evidence that they only received the object code for DynaSpice, not the source code, and that because object code "does not readily yield its underlying design to human understanding", possession of object code does not imply possession of information that would be protected as a trade secret. The trial court granted summary judgment in favor of Intel, stating that:

Silvaco appealed the trial court's decision.

Opinion of the court
The appeals court affirmed the decision of the trial court, granting summary judgment in favor of Intel. Agreeing with the trial court, the appeals court found that Intel never had possession of any trade secrets belonging to Silvaco, which CUTSA defines as one of the criteria for misappropriation of trade secrets. The court distinguished between the "use" of a trade secret—which would constitute an infringement—from the "use" of the software via executing its object code. The court reasoned in part by analogy:

The court also observed that accepting Silvaco's arguments would have dire policy consequences:

Impact
Several commentators observed that the court's decision in this case clarified the application of trade secret law to software. In particular, the court's decision supports the idea that although a program's object code is derived from the program's source code, an individual possessing the object code does not possess any knowledge of any trade secrets embodied in the source code.

The appeals court decision also prompted discussion because of a lengthy footnote contained in the opinion that decried the 8,000 pages of records filed with the court for this case, to which fact Justice Rushing commented: "Seldom have so many trees died for so little".

See also
 Uniform Trade Secrets Act

References 

Trade secret case law
California state case law
2010 in United States case law
United States computer case law
Intel litigation
2010 in California
Electronic design automation